János Benedek (born 20 November 1944 in Kiskunmajsa) is a Hungarian former weightlifter who competed in the 1968 Summer Olympics and in the 1972 Summer Olympics.

References

External links
 
 
 
 

1944 births
Living people
Hungarian male weightlifters
Olympic weightlifters of Hungary
Olympic bronze medalists for Hungary
Olympic medalists in weightlifting
Weightlifters at the 1968 Summer Olympics
Weightlifters at the 1972 Summer Olympics
Medalists at the 1972 Summer Olympics